The 66th Hong Kong Macau Interport was held in Macau on 20 June 2010. Hong Kong captured the champion by winning 5-1.

Squads

Hong Kong
 Head Coach: Tsang Wai Chung

Macau
 Head Coach:  Leung Sui Wing

Results

References

Hong Kong–Macau Interport
Macau
Hong